Saving Milly is a 2005 American made-for-television drama film that stars Madeleine Stowe and Bruce Greenwood, which first aired on CBS on March 13, 2005.  It is an adaptation of Morton Kondracke's nonfiction book of the same name.

Plot
Madeleine Stowe and Bruce Greenwood star in this drama based on the best-selling book and real-life journey of political journalist Mort Kondracke. The movie recounts his inspiring love story with his activist wife, Milly, and the dramatic change in their lives in the years after she is diagnosed with Parkinson's disease.

As a young journalist in Chicago in the '60s, Mort Kondracke envisioned marrying a Vassar graduate whose status would facilitate his goal of becoming a top Washington journalist. His calculated plans go awry when he meets and marries Milly Martinez, a brash part-Mexican, part-Catholic, part-Jewish liberal activist who captures his heart. In Washington, D.C., the loving, strong-willed partners build a passionate and volatile marriage while debating everything from politics to how to raise their two daughters as well as her insatiable, all-consuming desire to save the world by championing a never-ending list of causes—all overshadowed by Mort's struggle with alcoholism.

In 1987, their lives take a dramatic turn when Milly notices a change in her handwriting and a numbness in her fingers. After a series of tests, her worst fears are confirmed and, at the age of 47, Milly is diagnosed with Parkinson's disease.

Holding to his promise of "in sickness and in health," Mort changes his focus from being a die-hard careerist to becoming a devoted caregiver and Parkinson's advocate and the love between the couple grows stronger. As her illness progresses, his life becomes committed to saving Milly."

Cast
 Madeleine Stowe as Milly
 Bruce Greenwood as Mort Kondracke
 Robert Wisden as  	Fred Barnes
 Claudia Ferri	as	Norma Alvarado
 Rob LaBelle	as	Mark
 Brenda Campbell	as	Joan Samuelson
 Kyla Wise		as 	Andrea Kondracke (as Kyla Anderson)
 Erica Carroll	as 	Alexandra Kondracke
 Kylee Dubois	as 	Alexandra Kondracke (Age 16) (as Kyle Dubois)
 Jessica Lowndes	as	Andrea Kondracke (Age 15)
 Jose Del Buey	as	Carlos
 Dan Joffre		as 	Tony Hot Dog (as David 'Dan' Joffre)
 Leah Cairns	as 	Senator's Aide
 Susan Hogan	as	Senator Bates
 Michael J. Fox as Himself (Uncredited)
Allison Hossack

Reception
The film received a positive review from The New York Times.

Awards and nominations
 2005 Humanitas Prize -  Nominated - Jeff Arch for 90 Minute or Longer Category
 2005 Imagen Award - Won - Madeleine Stowe for Best Actress - Television

References

External links
 

2005 drama films
2005 television films
2005 films
CBS network films
Films scored by Lee Holdridge
Films directed by Dan Curtis
American drama television films
2000s English-language films
2000s American films
English-language drama films